Alexander Olof Bernhardsson (born 8 September 1998) is a Swedish football striker who plays for Elfsborg.

Career 
Bernhardsson made his full international debut for Sweden on 9 January 2023, playing for 90 minutes in a friendly 2–0 win against Finland.

Career statistics

International

References

1998 births
Living people
Swedish footballers
Sweden international footballers
Association football forwards
Jonsereds IF players
Örgryte IS players
IF Elfsborg players
Superettan players
Allsvenskan players